Akil Jakupi (born 1 August 1982) is an Albanian retired footballer who last played for Albanian First Division side KS Kastrioti as a defender.

Career
Jakupi joined Teuta Durrës in 2008 and was loaned out to Besa Kavajë for the entire 2010-11 season where he made 29 league appearances and where he won the 2010 Albanian Supercup. He returned to Teuta Durrës in the summer of 2011 where he has remained since. He signed a one-year contract extension in May 2013 keeping him at the club until the end of the 2013-14 season.

References

External links
 

1982 births
Living people
Footballers from Tirana
Albanian footballers
Association football defenders
Albania youth international footballers
KF Bylis Ballsh players
KF Laçi players
KF Apolonia Fier players
Besa Kavajë players
KS Turbina Cërrik players
KS Burreli players
KF Teuta Durrës players
Besëlidhja Lezhë players
KS Kastrioti players
Kategoria Superiore players
Kategoria e Parë players